Together We Stand Alone is the second studio album by Swedish singer Yohio, released in Sweden on 19 March 2014.

The album contains "To the End", the song Yohio performed in Melodifestivalen 2014 in a bid to represent Sweden in the Eurovision Song Contest 2014. The song finished sixth in the Final.

Track listing

Charts

References 

2014 albums
Yohio albums